The Historic composition of the House of Representatives of the Netherlands gives an overview of the composition of the House of Representatives (lower house) of the Dutch parliament. It shows the composition after elections, splits from parties are not included.

1815 to 1887 
The House of Representatives of the Netherlands was created in 1815 when the United Kingdom of the Netherlands was created. Initially it consisted of 110 members, chosen by the States-Provincial. Each year, one third of the members were up for reelection, and each member was elected for three years. In 1830, the southern provinces declared their independence in the Belgian Revolution, to become Belgium. Initially the Netherlands did not accept this, but the 55 members of the House of Representatives chosen by these provinces were no longer present at meetings, so the de facto membership was reduced to 55 members. 
After the Treaty of London in 1839, the Dutch government accepted the separation of Belgium, and became the Kingdom of the Netherlands. In 1840 the constitution was changed; all southern provinces except the eastern half of the province of Limburg (with three representatives) had left the Kingdom of the Netherlands, so the size of the House of Representatives was fixed at 58 members.

Following the revolutions of 1848, the constitution was changed. Elections for half of the house were held every two years, and each member held his seat for four years. The total membership was set at one member for each 45000 Dutch citizens; so the house increased to 68 members; in 1859 it grew further to 72 members.

1888 to 1946 
The constitution of 1887 changed the system; election were held every 4 years for all members at the same time, using a district system, and the total membership was set at 100 members.

In 1919, the constitution was changed: the districts system was abandoned, and proportional representation was used.

*: In 1929 the CPH entered with two lists, which both won one seat.

1946 to 1998 

Note: in 1956 the House of Representatives was enlarged from 100 to 150 members.

1998 to now

See also
 List of cabinets of the Netherlands
 List of prime ministers of the Netherlands
 Historic composition of the Eerste Kamer

References

House of Representatives (Netherlands)
 
Netherlands politics-related lists
Netherlands history-related lists